AOL Mail (stylized as Aol Mail.) is a free web-based email service provided by AOL, a division of Yahoo! Inc.

Features

AOL Mail has the following features available:
 Email attachment limit: 25 MB
 Max mailbox size: Unlimited
 Supported protocols: POP3, SMTP, IMAP
 Link to other email accounts from other service providers (such as Gmail and Hotmail).
 Ads: are displayed while working with the email account. Embedded links within emails are automatically disabled and can only be activated by the email user.
 Spam protection
 Virus protection
 Spell checking
 Domains: @aol.com and previously @love.com, @ygm.com (short for you've got mail), @games.com, and @wow.com
 Supports TLS/HTTPS after login

If an AOL Mail account is inactive for 90 days, it may become deactivated, at which point any emails sent to it may not be delivered and may be returned to sender. After 180 days of inactivity, the account may be deleted.

History
In 1993, both America Online (AOL) and Delphi started connecting their proprietary e-mail services to the Internet.

As of October 1997, AOL Mail was the world's largest e-mail provider, with around 9 million subscribers (identical with the number of AOL subscribers).

In 1997, AOL launched NetMail, a web-based version of its e-mail service. It was initially criticized for only working on Internet Explorer, but a later Java-written version ensured compatibility with Netscape Navigator. The service was renamed AOL Mail on the Web in December 1999.

In January 2001, an e-mail alert service for text-based digital cellphones and pagers was launched.

In 2004, AOL tested a new free webmail service for the public, without the need of customers subscribing to AOL. This was done in an effort to compete better against MSN Hotmail, Yahoo! Mail and Gmail. The service launched in May 2005 under the name AIM Mail, with 2 gigabytes of mail storage and tightly integrated with AOL Instant Messenger (AIM). It is based on technology from MailBlocks, which AOL acquired in 2004.

From August 2006, AOL became entirely free of charge for broadband users. The same month, Netscape Mail was migrated to AIM Mail.

In November 2010, AOL released Project Phoenix, an email application program that features a Quick Bar where emails, text messages, and AOL Instant Messenger messages can be sent from one area. It also lets people add up to five accounts into it. In 2012, AOL released the Alto Mail software.

As of July 2012, there were 24 million AOL Mail users. By 2021, the number of paying users had dropped to 1.5 million. 

On March 16, 2017, Verizon, which had acquired AOL in 2015, announced that it would discontinue its in-house email services for internet subscribers, and migrate all customers to AOL Mail.

See also
 Comparison of webmail providers
 Gmail
 Outlook.com
 Yahoo! Mail

References

External links
 

Mail
Computer-related introductions in 1993
Internet properties established in 1993
Webmail